Abdulla Shahid (born 26 May 1962) is a Maldivian politician who served as President of the 76th United Nations General Assembly between 2021 and 2022. Shahid is the first Maldivian politician to hold that post. He has been serving as  Minister of Foreign Affairs, Maldives since 2018.

Early life and education

Shahid joined the Ministry of Foreign Affairs in 1984, then he had his bachelor's degree in political science at the Canberra College of Advanced Education in 1987. In 1990, he was a member of the advisory board of President Maumoon Abdul Gayoom until 1994. In the meantime, he took a master's degree in international relations from the Fletcher School of Law and Diplomacy, Tufts University in 1991.

Career

Shahid served as the Speaker of the People’s Majlis of the Maldives from 2009 to 2014. He was elected as the Speaker of the People’s Majlis on 28 May 2009, the seventeenth holder of the position. He won 42 votes out of 75 votes. Shahid played a key role in the Maldives’ transition to democracy in 2008. Abdulla Shahid is a member of MDP and is the parliament member for Henveiru Uthuru.

Prior to his role as an MP, Shahid served in the Ministry of Foreign Affairs from 1984, eventually becoming Director in 1993. In this capacity, he also headed the International Organizations and Conferences Department, representing the Maldives at meetings and international gatherings including the United Nations, the Commonwealth of Nations, the Non-Aligned Movement and the Organization of Islamic Conference.

Member of Parliament

In 2000, Shahid was elected as the Representative of the Vaavu Atoll constituency and served two terms as the Atoll’s Member. Shahid served in the Special Majlis (July 2004 – August 2008) which drafted the new Constitution of the Maldives. In May 2009, in the first multi-party parliamentary elections of the Maldives, Shahid won the Keyodhoo Constituency.

Minister of Foreign Affairs

Shahid served as Minister of Foreign Affairs from 23 August 2007 to 11 November 2008, in the presidency of Maumoon Abdul Gayoom. He had been appointed Minister of State for Foreign Affairs in 2005.

On 15 April 2013, Shahid resigned from the Dhivehi Rayyithunge Party. On 18 April 2013, he announced on Twitter that he had signed for MDP.

UN General Assembly President

On 7 June 2021, Shahid was elected as the 76th President of the United Nations General Assembly with an overwhelming 75 percent majority, with 143 in favour, 48 against, and no abstentions or invalid votes. On 23 December 2021 Shahid tested positive for COVID-19.

References

1962 births
Living people
Dhivehi Rayyithunge Party politicians
Foreign Ministers of the Maldives
Maldivian Muslims
Maldivian politicians
Members of the People's Majlis
People from Malé
Presidents of the United Nations General Assembly
Speakers of the People's Majlis
The Fletcher School at Tufts University alumni
University of Canberra alumni